The Sacramento California Temple is the 123rd operating temple of the Church of Jesus Christ of Latter-day Saints (LDS Church).

The temple was the seventh built by the church in California, more than any state except Utah. The Sacramento California Temple serves a membership which totals approximately 80,000 in the area.

History
The LDS Church's First Presidency announced on April 21, 2001, that a temple would be built in the Sacramento area. The Sacramento California Temple was announced the same day as the Redlands California Temple and the Newport Beach California Temple.

Plans for building the temple were met with little resistance by the surrounding communities and government bodies. Many were glad for the building of the temple in the area, because it would improve the land and bring visitors and money into the area. There was some concern about the height of the temple spire, and the church agreed to lower it .

On August 22, 2004, a site dedication and groundbreaking ceremony were held. LDS Church president Gordon B. Hinckley presided at the ceremony and gave the site dedication prayer. Other prominent church members from the area also attended the groundbreaking and site dedication, including Congressman John Doolittle. The temple grounds were designed to fit in with the surrounding landscape. The temple design is slightly larger than most of the LDS temples constructed at the same time.

An open house was held July 29 – August 26, 2006, to allow the public to tour the temple prior to its dedication. Hinckley dedicated the Sacramento California Temple on September 3, 2006. The dedication was given in four sessions and carried by feed to meetinghouses to allow all those who would like to attend the opportunity to participate. The night before the dedication, a cultural celebration was performed at ARCO Arena.

In 2018, a temple was announced in nearby Yuba City, California. In March 2020, the temple was closed due to the coronavirus pandemic.

Gallery

See also

 William W. Parmley, former temple president
 Comparison of temples of The Church of Jesus Christ of Latter-day Saints
 List of temples of The Church of Jesus Christ of Latter-day Saints
 List of temples of The Church of Jesus Christ of Latter-day Saints by geographic region
 Temple architecture (LDS Church)
 The Church of Jesus Christ of Latter-day Saints in California

References

External links

Sacramento California Temple Official site
Sacramento California Temple at ChurchofJesusChristTemples.org

21st-century Latter Day Saint temples
Religious buildings and structures in Sacramento, California
Religious buildings and structures in Sacramento County, California
Religious buildings and structures completed in 2006
Temples (LDS Church) in California
2006 establishments in California